The 4th Directors Guild of America Awards, honoring the outstanding directorial achievements in film in 1951, were presented in 1952.

Winners and nominees

Film

Special awards

External links
 

Directors Guild of America Awards
1951 film awards
1951 television awards
1951 in American cinema
1951 in American television